The Casino Theatre building is an historic structure located at 643 5th Avenue in the Gaslamp Quarter, San Diego, in the U.S. state of California. It was built in 1912.

See also
 List of Gaslamp Quarter historic buildings

External links

 

1912 establishments in California
Buildings and structures completed in 1912
Buildings and structures in San Diego
Gaslamp Quarter, San Diego